Machiel Evert Noordeloos (born 16 April 1949) is a Dutch mycologist. He is known for his contributions to the taxonomy of European mushrooms and especially his expertise on the genus Entoloma. Noordeloos is an assistant professor at the Nationaal Herbarium Nederland, and has served as the editor of the mycological journals Persoonia since 1991 and Coolia since 1976. He was in 2011 the editor in chief of Persoonia. He was the recipient of the Clusius Prize awarded by the Hungarian Mycological Society in 2009.

Eponymous taxa
Entoloma noordeloosi Hauskn.
Entoloma machieli A. De Meijer

See also
 :Category:Taxa named by Machiel Noordeloos

References

1949 births
Living people
Dutch mycologists
Leiden University alumni
Scientists from The Hague